The Thomson Medal and Prize is an award which has been made, originally only biennially in even-numbered years, since 2008 by the British Institute of Physics for "distinguished research in atomic (including quantum optics) or molecular physics". It is named after Nobel prizewinner Sir J. J. Thomson, the British physicist who demonstrated the existence of electrons, and comprises a silver medal and a prize of £1000.

Not to be confused with the J. J. Thomson IET Achievement Medal for electronics.

Medallists
The following have received a medal:
2022: Michael Tarbutt, for pioneering experimental and theoretical work on the production of ultracold molecules by laser cooling, and the applications of those molecules to quantum science and tests of fundamental physics.
2021: Carla Faria, for distinguished contributions to the theory of strong-field laser-matter interactions.
2020: Michael Charlton, for scientific leadership in antimatter science.
2019: , for outstanding contributions to experiments on ultra-cold atoms and molecules 
2016: Jeremy M. Hutson, for his pioneering work on the theory of ultracold molecules 
2014: Charles S Adams, for his imaginative experiments which have pioneered the field of Rydberg quantum optics
2012: , for his pioneering experimental work in Bose-Einstein condensates and cold Fermi gases
2010: , for her contributions to the development of the world's only positronium beam
2008: Edward Hinds, for his important and elegant experimental investigations in the fields of atomic physics and quantum optics

See also
 Institute of Physics Awards
 List of physics awards
 List of awards named after people

References 

Awards established in 2008
Awards of the Institute of Physics
Quantum optics
Atomic, molecular, and optical physics